The Mayor of Waitomo officiates over the Waitomo District of New Zealand's North Island.

John Robertson is the current mayor of Waitomo. He was elected mayor in 2019.

List of mayors

References

Waitomo
Waitomo
Waitomo District
Waitomo